Alhassan Nuhu (born 4 June 1993) is a Ghanaian footballer who last played for New Edubiase United.

Career
Nuhu began his career by AC Milan Colts Club in Tema, before in 2006 was transferred to Real Sportive, after the relegation of his club from the Ghana Premier League left Alhassan his club alongside his twin brother Fuseini and signed for New Edubiase United. In June 2011 he and Fuseini were transferred to Moldavian vice-champion FC Sheriff Tiraspol.

Nuhu joined Ashanti Gold in 2015, scoring on his debut, against Medeama. He was released after a single season, having made 20 appearances for the club. He then returned to New Edubiase United for a brief spell.

Personal life
Nuhu played with his brother Fuseini by the team from Tema.

References

External links

1989 births
Ghanaian footballers
Real Sportive players
New Edubiase United F.C. players
Expatriate footballers in Moldova
People from Tema
Ghanaian twins
Living people
Ghanaian Muslims
Association football midfielders
Ghanaian expatriate sportspeople in Moldova
Ghanaian expatriate footballers